Rory Markas (December 20, 1955 – January 4, 2010) was an American sportscaster best known as the Los Angeles Angels of Anaheim's play-by-play broadcaster for eight seasons and as the radio voice of the University of Southern California men's basketball team for 11 seasons. He also worked as a field reporter and part-time sports anchor for KTTV.

Born in Hollywood, California, Markas was a graduate of Los Angeles Valley College, California State University-Northridge, and Chatsworth High School. He won four Golden Mike Awards, two Associated Press Sportscasting Awards, and the 2008 Radio Play-by-Play Award from the Southern California Broadcasters Association.

Early career
Markas previously worked for KTUC in Tucson, CBS' KNX-AM and KCBS-TV, the Los Angeles Clippers, the Milwaukee Brewers, Fox Sports Net West, and the Pacific Coast League's Salt Lake City Gulls and Vancouver Canadians.  He was also the lead announcer for RollerJam from its second season to its last. Most recently, and possibly his final effort, was the recording of the play-by-play segments for the upcoming motion picture "The Yankles". Rory Markas's voice is the first and last voice heard in the movie.

Health issues and death
In late 2008, Markas underwent surgery to remove a blood clot in his brain, which sidelined him for about six weeks. Steve Physioc, his Angels partner, filled in for Rory on several USC basketball games.  USC's regular radio voice for football and previous voice in basketball, Pete Arbogast filled in for most of the rest of that season.

On January 4, 2010, the 54-year-old Markas was found dead at his Palmdale, California home, the victim of an apparent heart attack.

Many obituaries noted that Markas would be remembered for his signature "Just another Halo victory!" call after Angel wins, and for his call of the final play of the 2002 World Series at Angel Stadium. He was also known for his interviewing skills—for example, his Angels radio pre-game talk with former Negro leagues player Buck O'Neil.

See also

 List of Los Angeles Angels of Anaheim broadcasters

References

External links
 
 
 Markas' biography on AngelsBaseball.com
 News coverage of Markas' death from FOX11 KTTV
 Markas' obituary on KLAA-AM830 website
 Highlights of Markas baseball calls
 
 Tribute from Lyle Spencer of mlb.com
 Rory Markas and The Yankles

1955 births
2010 deaths
American television sports announcers
College basketball announcers in the United States
Los Angeles Clippers announcers
Los Angeles Angels of Anaheim announcers
Major League Baseball broadcasters
Milwaukee Brewers announcers
Minor League Baseball broadcasters
National Basketball Association broadcasters
People from Hollywood, Los Angeles
People from Palmdale, California
Sportspeople from Los Angeles
USC Trojans men's basketball announcers